Heilig Landstichting (Dutch for Holy Land Foundation) is a village in the eastern Netherlands. It is located in the municipality of Berg en Dal, Gelderland, near Nijmegen.

History 
The Heilig-Landstichting was founded in 1911 to give an overview of the time of the Bible and Palestina. In 1913, construction started, and since 2007 it is called Museumpark Orientalis. It used to be a little agricultural hamlet called De Ploeg. A village developed around the museum in along the roads. A convent was constructed in 1915. A basilicum was originally planned, but cancelled. After World War II, the village developed a more dense core.

Gallery

References 

Populated places in Gelderland
Geography of Berg en Dal (municipality)
Christian museums